Curtis Lepore (born June 28, 1983) is an American actor, musician and internet celebrity known for his Vine videos. As of August 2016, he was ranked as the seventh most popular user on Vine.

Career
From 2009–2012, Curtis Lepore was the frontman of straight edge hardcore band, GhostXShip, a band he helped found in his hometown of Syracuse, New York. In 2012, Lepore issued a statement announcing his departure from the band. After leaving the band, Lepore also provided featured vocals on the song "Black Death" for beatdown hardcore band No Zodiac. Lepore and No Zodiac maintained close ties for many years. Lepore also embarked on a European tour with No Zodiac in 2013 where he provided lead vocals substituting for the band's then-vocalist Gerardo Pavon, who was unable to travel outside the country because of visa issues.

Many of Lepore's [Vine] videos involve collaborations with other Vine stars such as Lele Pons, Christian DelGrosso and KingBach. Lepore was one of the first clients of Vine talent agency, Grape Story.

Until a controversy in 2013, Lepore was part of one of the first online celebrity couples with his relationship to video blogger Jessi Vazquez. They were supposedly introduced by Vazquez's manager and engaged in a handful of public stunts and appearances as part of their relationship, including a public meeting in Washington Square Park which featured a live band and a special hashtag to commemorate the event. At the time, Lepore had over 1 million Vine followers. As of February 2014, Lepore has 7.5 million followers on Vine.

Personal life
Lepore was raised in Smithtown, New York.  He attended SUNY Oswego before moving to Los Angeles. He is vegan and straight edge. He had a Boston Terrier named Buster Beans whom he adopted in 2010 from an elderly couple who could no longer care for him. As of March 2015, Buster had over a million of his own followers on Vine. Buster died later in 2016. Lepore is actively involved in a variety of national and local charitable organizations, such as Stuff-A-Truck, a project which focuses on donating toys to underprivileged children.

Legal issues 
In October 2013, Lepore was alleged to have raped his then-girlfriend, Jessi "Smiles" Vazquez. The incident occurred when Vazquez was in Los Angeles recovering from a concussion. Vazquez stated that Lepore came over to help while she was recovering, and once asleep, Lepore raped her. Charges were filed in January 2014; Lepore, who pleaded not guilty to the charge, was released on $100,000 bail. In February 2014, Lepore took a plea deal in the case; the rape charges were dropped and he pleaded guilty to felony assault. In February 2015, Lepore's felony assault charges were reduced to a misdemeanor. In December 2019, Lepore released a statement talking about this case.

Filmography

Music videos

References

1983 births
Living people
American Internet celebrities
Vine (service) celebrities
Place of birth missing (living people)
State University of New York at Oswego alumni
People from Smithtown, New York
Twitch (service) streamers